Montpelier is a city in Bear Lake County, Idaho, United States. The population was 2,538 at the 2019 estimation, down from 2,597 in 2010 census. The city is the largest community in the Bear Lake Valley, a farming region north of Bear Lake in southeastern Idaho along the Utah border. It was settled in 1863 by Mormon pioneers on the route of the Oregon Trail. Nearby to the east is the border with Wyoming.

History

As happened for many western towns, the name has been changed numerous times. First it was known as Clover Creek by Oregon Trail travelers, later it became Belmont and finally was given the name Montpelier by Brigham Young, one of the early leaders of the Church of Jesus Christ of Latter-day Saints (LDS Church), after the capital of his birth state of Vermont.  The city was first settled in 1864.

The Oregon Short Line Railway started in Granger, Wyoming from the existing Union Pacific station, and reached Montpelier on August 5, 1882 (the rail line reached Huntington, Oregon in 1884). The terminal was located here until 1972. The railroad brought a population that made Montpelier the county's "Gentile Town" as opposed to nearby Mormon-run Paris that was the county seat. Both cities would have tabernacles built in their city limits.

U.S. Routes 89 and 30 intersect in Montpelier.

In 1896, Montpelier was the site of a bank heist by Butch Cassidy and members of Butch Cassidy's Wild Bunch, Elzy Lay and Henry "Bub" Meeks, who were supposedly trying to get enough money to bail out fellow gang member Matt Warner.  This historical footnote has become a notable component of the town's identity and is commemorated by a plaque on Washington Street (Highway 89).

The Montpelier Historic District is listed on the National Register of Historic Places.  It includes four buildings:  the city hall, a high school, the high school's gymnasium, and an LDS church.

On 3 April 2022, LDS Prophet Russell M. Nelson announced that an LDS Temple would be built in Montpelier.

Geography

Climate
According to the Köppen climate classification, Montpelier has a warm-summer humid continental climate (Köppen climate classification: Dfb).

Demographics

2010 census
As of the census of 2010, there were 2,597 people, 1,006 households, and 680 families living in the city. The racial makeup of the city was 96.2% White, 0.4% Native American, 0.2% Asian, 2.0% from other races, and 1.2% from two or more races. Hispanic or Latino of any race were 4.9% of the population.

There were 1,006 households, of which 35.0% had children under the age of 18 living with them, 55.6% were married couples living together, 8.1% had a female householder with no husband present, 4.0% had a male householder with no wife present, and 32.4% were non-families. 28.5% of all households were made up of individuals, and 13.1% had someone living alone who was 65 years of age or older. The average household size was 2.55 and the average family size was 3.17.

The median age in the city was 36.4 years. 29.1% of residents were under the age of 18; 6.5% were between the ages of 18 and 24; 23.4% were from 25 to 44; 23.9% were from 45 to 64; and 17.1% were 65 years of age or older. The gender makeup of the city was 48.2% male and 51.8% female.

2000 census
As of the census of 2000, there were 2,785 people, 1,012 households, and 715 families living in the city. The racial makeup of the city was 96.70% White, 0.61% Native American, 0.04% Pacific Islander, 1.97% from other races, and 0.68% from two or more races. Hispanic or Latino of any race were 3.81% of the population.

There were 1,012 households, out of which 38.4% had children under the age of 18 living with them, 58.7% were married couples living together, 8.8% had a female householder with no husband present, and 29.3% were non-families. 26.6% of all households were made up of individuals, and 13.9% had someone living alone who was 65 years of age or older.  The average household size was 2.70 and the average family size was 3.31.

In the city, the population was spread out, with 32.3% under the age of 18, 8.3% from 18 to 24, 23.6% from 25 to 44, 19.4% from 45 to 64, and 16.6% who were 65 years of age or older.  The median age was 34 years. For every 100 females, there were 96.3 males.  For every 100 females age 18 and over, there were 93.4 males.

The median income for a household in the city was $29,693, and the median income for a family was $33,639. Males had a median income of $32,218 versus $15,227 for females. The per capita income for the city was $12,364.  About 9.2% of families and 12.9% of the population were below the poverty line, including 17.6% of those under age 18 and 9.2% of those age 65 or over.

References

External links

 

Cities in Bear Lake County, Idaho
Cities in Idaho
Populated places established in 1864